Clattercote Priory was a Gilbertine priory in Oxfordshire, England.

It was founded for Gilbertine canons to run a hospital in the mid-twelfth century, possibly by Robert de Chesney.
The hospital ceased before 1262. The priory was refounded 1251–62. It was dissolved in 1538 and granted to Thomas Lee around 1559. The site is now occupied by a private house.

References

Monasteries in Oxfordshire
Gilbertine monasteries
Christian monasteries established in the 12th century
12th-century establishments in England
1538 disestablishments in England